Harris Ledge is a flat, ice-free ridge to the north of Mount Hercules in the Olympus Range of Victoria Land, Antarctica. It was named by the Advisory Committee on Antarctic Names in 1997 after Henry Harris of the Illinois State Geological Survey, who made hydrogeological studies with Keros Cartwright (after whom Cartwright Valley is named) in Victoria Valley, Wright Valley, and Taylor Valley during the Dry Valley Drilling Project in the 1973–74, 1974–75, and 1975–76 seasons.

References

Ridges of Victoria Land
McMurdo Dry Valleys